Zelig is a 1983 Woody Allen film.

Zelig may also refer to:
Zelig (name)
Zelig Records

See also 
 
Selig (disambiguation)